Antonio Barreca (born 18 March 1995) is an Italian professional footballer who plays as a left-back for  club Cagliari.

Club career

Early career
Born in Turin to Sicilian parents, he grew up in the Torino youth, where he played for each youth category up to the Primavera. In 2013–14, he led the Primavera to the finals of the Campionato Primavera, lost on penalties to Chievo. Coinciding with Torino's injury problems that season he was regularly called up to the first team by Giampiero Ventura.

Loans to Cittadella and Cagliari
In his first season as a professional, Barreca was sent on loan to Cittadella in Serie B. He made his debut in the third round of Coppa Italia, lost 4–1 to Sassuolo. Barreca scored his first goal in Serie B on 15 November 2014 in a 5–2 away loss to Carpi.

On 17 June 2015, he was loaned to Cagliari with a buyout clause and buy back clause in favour of Torino. He made his debut with the Sardi in the eighth round, away to Novara (1–0). He made 15 appearances for Cagliari, led by Massimo Rastelli, who won the championship and were promoted to Serie A. On 26 June 2016 his contract was redeemed by Torino.

Torino
He made his debut for Torino on 13 August 2016, in the third round of the Coppa Italia, won 4–1 against Pro Vercelli at the Stadio Olimpico Grande Torino. On 18 September, at age 21, he made his debut in Serie A, entering as a substitute for Christian Molinaro in the first half of the match Torino Empoli (0–0). In December 2016 he was awarded the best young player of the year by the USSI (Unione Stampa Sportiva Italiana).

Monaco
On 10 July 2018, he was sold to Ligue 1 club Monaco. On 25 August 2022, Barreca's contract with Monaco was terminated by mutual consent.

Loans to Newcastle United, Genoa, Fiorentina, and Lecce
On 31 January 2019, Barreca joined Premier League side Newcastle United on loan until the end of the 2018–19 season. He made his only appearance coming on as a substitute against Tottenham Hostspur in a 1-0 away loss. On 11 July 2019, he joined Genoa C.F.C. on loan with an option to buy. On 5 October 2020, he signed for Fiorentina on the same basis.

In 2021 he was loaned to Lecce of Serie B.

Return to Cagliari
On 25 August 2022, Barreca signed a three-year contract with Cagliari.

International career
He represented the Italy U-20 team on 6 January 2013 in a match valid for the Under-20 Four Nations Tournament. Gli Azzurrini lost 2–1 away to Poland.

He made his debut with the Italy U-21 squad on 12 August 2015, in a friendly match against Hungary, played in Telki.

In June 2017, he was included in the Italy under-21 squad for the 2017 UEFA European Under-21 Championship by manager Luigi Di Biagio. Italy were eliminated in the semi-finals following a 3–1 defeat to Spain on 27 June.

Style of play
Barreca mainly covers the role of a left full-back or wing-back, but is often used with good results as a winger: he has notable speed, crossing ability and vision of the game.

Career statistics

Club
Updated 22 May 2021.

Honours

Club
Cagliari
Serie B: 2015–16

References

External links
 
 
 Goal Profile

1995 births
Living people
Association football fullbacks
Italian footballers
Italian expatriate sportspeople in Monaco
Expatriate footballers in Monaco
Italian expatriate sportspeople in England
Expatriate footballers in England
Italy under-21 international footballers
Italy youth international footballers
People of Sicilian descent
Footballers from Turin
A.S. Cittadella players
Cagliari Calcio players
Torino F.C. players
AS Monaco FC players
Newcastle United F.C. players
Genoa C.F.C. players
ACF Fiorentina players
Serie A players
Serie B players
Ligue 1 players
Premier League players